Jules Schelvis (7 January 1921 – 3 April 2016) was a Dutch Jewish historian, writer, printer, and Holocaust survivor. Schelvis was the sole survivor among the 3,005 people on the 14th transport from Westerbork to Sobibor extermination camp, having been selected to work at nearby Dorohucza labour camp. He is known for his memoirs and historical research about Sobibor, for which he earned an honorary doctorate from the University of Amsterdam, Officier in the Order of Orange-Nassau, and Order of Merit of the Republic of Poland.

Schelvis was born in Amsterdam, part of a secular Jewish family. After high school, he trained as a printer and worked for Printing Office Lindenbaum in Amsterdam. Once the German occupation began, Schelvis was fired for being Jewish. He subsequently worked at various newspapers and participated in a local youth labour organization, where he met and courted a woman named Rachel Borzykowski. Schelvis grew close to Borzykowski and her family, whose residence was a local center of Yiddish culture. Schelvis and Borzykowski married in 1940, partly in the hope that this would protect her and her Polish Jewish immigrant family from deportation.

However, Schelvis and his family were rounded up in Amsterdam on 26 May 1943. They were deported to Westerbork transit camp, where they spent six days before being sent to Sobibor extermination camp. They were among the 3,005 Dutch Jews on the 14th transport to Sobibor. The journey lasted for 4 days. At the Sobibor arrival ramp, Schelvis was selected to join a work unit sent to Dorohucza labor camp. The rest of his family and the Borzykowskis were gassed immediately.

At Dorohucza, Polish and Dutch Jews were forced to work in abominable conditions building latifundia for Generalplan Ost. Schelvis survived because he asked for a meeting with the camp commandant, who happened to be aware that another nearby labor camp needed a printer. However, for unclear reasons, Schelvis was instead sent to Lublin airfield camp, where he was forced to build barracks. From there, he was transferred to Radom Ghetto, where he was tasked with reassembling a printing press which had been disassembled for transport from Warsaw. Conditions in Radom where significantly better than Schelvis had experienced in Lublin or Dorohucza. With the Red Army approaching, Schelvis was sent on a death march to Tomaszów Mazowiecki. From there he eventually reached Vaihingen near Stuttgart, where he was liberated by the French army on 8 April 1945.

Schelvis was a plaintiff and expert witness during the trials of Karl Frenzel, John Demjanjuk, among other Holocaust perpetrators. He is the founder of Stichting Sobibor as well as the author of several memoirs and historical studies about Sobibor.

Notable works 
Sobibor: A History of a Nazi Death Camp (2014) Bloomsbury Academic. 
Vernietigingskamp Sobibor (1993) Amsterdam: Bataafsche Leeuw. 
Binnen de poorten, 1995, Amsterdam: Bataafsche Leeuw. 
Sobibor. Transportlijsten, 2001, Amsterdam: Bataafsche Leeuw.

References

1921 births
2016 deaths
Dutch diarists
Dutch essayists
20th-century Dutch historians
Dutch people of World War II
Historians of the Holocaust
Historians of Nazism
Historians of World War II
Jewish anti-fascists
Jewish historians
Jewish Dutch writers
Nazi hunters
Sobibor extermination camp survivors
Writers on antisemitism
Writers from Amsterdam